Erekosë (also known as John Daker) is a heroic warrior in different fantasy adventure stories by English writer Michael Moorcock. The character repeatedly assumes different forms and identities during adventures across Moorcock's multiverse. He first appeared in the 1962 novella The Eternal Champion, which was later expanded into a novel of the same title in 1970. The book became the first of the Erekosë book series, which includes the novels Phoenix in Obsidian (also published as The Silver Warriors) and The Dragon in the Sword. The Erekosë canon The Swords of Heaven, the Flowers of Hell, is a graphic novel plotted by Moorcock that was scripted and illustrated by Howard Chaykin. In Moorcock's novels The Vanishing Tower and The King of the Swords, Erekosë is described as a man with "jet black skin", often wearing a bear-skin cloak.

In the first story, John Daker lives on Earth in the 20th century. For several nights, he hears a voice calling him "Erekosë" and asking him to protect humanity. Responding to the call, Daker's spirit is pulled to a different part of space and time where humanity is at war with another race. In this time and place, Daker manifests with the body of Erekosë, a warrior who died long ago. Due to flashes of knowledge and memories from different past lives, Daker accepts he is a reincarnation of Erekosë and also the "Eternal Champion", a soul who is reborn frequently throughout the multiverse. As his memories of Daker's life fade and his mind shifts to that of Erekosë, he accepts his altered identity and attempts to end a great war. Across the Erekosë book series, the hero fights forces of corruption and evil, then later leaves that world (sometimes not by choice) and appears elsewhere in the multiverse with a new identity that once belonged to a dead hero of that world. His later identities include Urlik Skarsol, Clen of Clen-Gar, and Prince Flamadin. Despite his changes in form and identity, he maintains his memories and often prefers to be called Erekosë. In some stories, his adventures across time and space allow him to meet other incarnations of the Eternal Champion, such as Elric of Melniboné, Prince Corum, and Dorian Hawkmoon.

Publishing history 
Erekosë/John Draker was introduced in the novella The Eternal Champion in the anthology magazine series Science Fantasy #53, published in June 1962. The novella was expanded into the novel The Eternal Champion in 1970 by Dell (the first UK edition was published under Dell's imprint Mayflower Books). A hardcover edition was published by Harper & Row in 1978. The story also introduces Erekosë's romantic interests Iolinda, a human princess, and Ermizhad, a leader of the Eldren race.

The novel expanded on the character's knowledge of his other lives as different incarnations of the Eternal Champion and made some minor changes to early scenes, as well as some text descriptions and structure. Unlike many of Moorcock's stories, The Eternal Champion is told from a first person perspective, allowing the reader to know John Draker's thoughts as he experiences an increased awareness of his other lives and shifts into the identity of Erekosë. Other Eternal Champions are named in Erekosë's memories. The novel also incorporates elements from other stories Moorcock had published in other short stories.

The novel has been republished several times since and is now considered the first of Moorcock's Erekosë series. This series includes the novels:
 The Eternal Champion (1970)
 Phoenix in Obsidian (1970)
 The Dragon in the Sword (1987)

In 1972, the first US edition of Phoenix in Obsidian was published as The Silver Warriors. Later US editions have used the title Phoenix in Obsidian.

Erekosë appeared in the Corum novel The King of the Swords (1971), the first crossover between different Eternal Champion characters of Michael Moorcock's multiverse. The book featured a meeting between Erekosë, Corum of the Scarlet Cloak, and Elric of Melniboné. The events of this story are retold with some new information in the Elric novel The Sleeping Sorceress (later republished as The Vanishing Tower). The three team-up Eternal Champions meet again in the Hawkmoon novel The Quest for Tanelorn (1975), this time joined by another Eternal Champion named Dorian Hawkmoon. The events of this team-up are retold from Elric's perspective and slightly expanded on in the novel The Sailors on the Seas of Fate (1976).

Erekosë was the lead character of The Swords of Heaven, the Flowers of Hell, a graphic novel published in 1979 which acts as a sequel to Phoenix in Obsidian. Although the story is plotted by Michael Moorcock, the graphic novel was scripted and illustrated by Howard Chaykin. The graphic novel is considered canon and is referenced in the final Erekosë novel The Dragon in the Sword.

White Wolf Publishing's omnibus collection The Eternal Champion includes the novels The Eternal Champion and Phoenix in Obsidian. As a bonus, this omnibus also includes Moorcock's novel The Sundered Worlds, despite it not being part of the Erekosë series. The White Wolf Von Bek omnibus included the novel The Dragon in the Sword in its collection.

Role as the Eternal Champion
Moorcock's other Eternal Champion characters are killed or die by natural means before they are reborn as an infant who will grow into a new Eternal Champion. Daker/Erekosë is unique in that his existence in one life seems to repeatedly be interrupted by the multiverse calling him to assume a new identity elsewhere. John Daker lives an ordinary life that is interrupted when his dreams draw him across time and space to assume the life of the reborn Erekosë. After a century of living in that identity, the character is repeatedly pulled across time and space to assume new lives again before having a chance to physically die. Across the Erekosë book series (and graphic novel), his identities include Urlik Skarsol, Clen of Clen-Gar, and Prince Flamadin. In each case, as with his first adventure, Daker/Erekosë arrives in his new life with the memories and body of a hero who died many years before. Some fans accept all of these identities as different past lives led by Daker/Erekosë and assume that the same cosmic forces pulling him through space and time also simply create new forms for him rather than have him animate old bodies that have decayed. Some other fans, however, speculate that the original Erekosë, Urlik, Clen, and Flamadin were either not his actual past lives or fellow aspects of the Eternal Champion, just people whose memories and forms Daker is copying when he arrives. This idea is never confirmed or remarked on in Moorcock's text.

While some Eternal Champions do learn of their role in the multiverse or gain glimpses of a few other identities they've had or will have, Daker/Erekosë gains much greater knowledge and understanding, at times leading him to be tormented by the memories and principles of his other lives. This also gives him special insight when meeting other incarnations of the Eternal Champion. During these team-ups, he decides to call himself simply Erekosë even if he is not in a form resembling that identity, since it was during that life that he knew the most peace.

Most incarnations of the Eternal Champion spend many adventures with an "Eternal Companion" or "Companion to Champions", a soul constantly reincarnated throughout the multiverse who is driven to provide aid and emotional support to the Champion and who shares his fate to some degree. Although Erekosë (as Urlick) seems to meet an aspect of the Eternal Companion during the events of Phoenix in Obsidian, they quickly part ways and do not share any adventures together. Some fans have speculated that Daker/Erekosë's frequent habit of moving through different planes of time and space may have the side effect of preventing his partnership with the Eternal Companion. One incarnation of the Eternal Companion, Jhary-a-Conel, has basic, fleeting memories of all his other lives. Unlike Erekosë, these memories don't torment him.

Incarnations of the Black Sword 
Like the Eternal champion, the Black Sword is a dark weapon that emerges throughout the multiverse in different forms and aspects. Erekosë initially uses a radioactive sword called Kanajana, a weapon that is an echo or shadow of the multiversal Black Sword and which only he can safely use without poisoning himself in the process. As Urlick Skarsol, he uses a true incarnation of the Black Sword rather than an echo of it. Urlick's weapon is the dark, sentient blade called the Cold Sword that screams when used and kills only its chosen prey. In his life as Prince Flamadin, he uses another incarnation of the Black Sword. This aspect is called the Dragon Sword due to the fact that is contains a cosmic dragon in its blade. Later, the Dragon Sword is split into two, leading to the creation of the sword Mournblade and its twin Stormbringer, the latter of which is the same weapon later used by the Eternal Champion named Elric of Melniboné.

Fictional character biography 
The details of John Daker's life are vague. The later novel The Dragon in the Sword reveals John Daker is born in 1941, the son of Paul and Helen Daker. As an adult, Daker has a wife and child whom he loves but no further information is given. He has an occupation that does not interest him and feels unfulfilled in life.

The Eternal Champion (1970) 
One night, while thinking of morality and "the futility of human existence", Draker hears a voice calling him to action in order to protect humanity. The voice calls him Erekosë. Daker hears the voice on several other occasions and makes an effort to hear it better and answer its call, though also seems uncertain he has a choice to ignore it. Finally, his spirit moves through time and space and he realizes he is the Eternal Champion, a being who is reborn time and again throughout the multiverse. Throughout their lives, the Eternal Champion is called to maintain or restore the balance between the cosmic forces of Chaos and Law when needed. While many Eternal Champions only remember their current life and existence, Draker's trip through time and space reveals scattered memories from many other incarnations, such as Erekosë and Michael Moorcock's other characters such as Elric of Melniboné, Prince Corum, Dorian Hawkmoon, Jerry Cornelius, the Rose, and members of the family von Bek.

Daker manifests on another version of Earth (he is not certain if it's the distant past or distant future), in the tomb of Erekosë, a long dead warrior who was prophesied to return when needed. Daker now inhabits a body that resembles Erekosë's (whose face reminds him of his own). Draker knows Erekosë was a past life of his and understands he's been called to resume that particular role again. After just a few hours, he remarks that his memory of being John Daker is dimming while his knowledge of Erekosë's life and way of thinking becomes stronger. Although he isn't entirely sure how all this has happened, he accepts that this is his life and role now. He even laughs happily when he is reunited with Kanajana, the radioactive sword of Erekosë that poisons everyone except him when it is unsheathed.

Erekosë learns he is in the fortress city of Necranal, the capital of human society on this world. The humans are at war with the Eldren race. Erekosë suspects humanity is engaged in a war motivated by racial bigotry towards the Eldren, but feels that as a human himself he must be loyal to Necranal for now. He also falls in love with Iolinda, princess of Necral, and the two are engaged. After going into battle with the humans, Erekosë is appalled by their ruthlessness and thirst for violence. Ermizahd, sister of Prince Arjavh who commands the Eldren forces, is taken prisoner and placed in Erekosë's custody. He sympathizes with her and later learns from her brother that the Eldren were the first inhabitants of Earth (or at least this version of Earth) and that they have great technology from an earlier war that could destroy humanity but refuse to use it out of moral principle. After Ermizahd escapes, Princess Iolinda realizes Erekosë is sympathetic to the Eldren and deems him a traitor to be executed. To quell the anger of his betrothed, Erekosë vows to help humanity kill all Eldren, if only to end the fighting and allow humanity a chance at peace.

After a year of fighting and new dreams regarding his role as the Eternal Champion, Erekosë make one last attempt at peace rather than genocide. Iolinda and the humans of Necral won't listen and Erekosë joins the Eldren at their final outpost Loos Ptokai. When it is clear the final battle will soon be lost, Erekosë convinces Arjavh to allow the use of the ancient war machines so the Eldren are not completely wiped out. With this technology, Erekosë destroys the army of Necranal, ending the war. Despite his earlier arguments against genocide, Erekosë then kills the humans remaining in Necranal and tracks down the remaining survivors. With humanity gone, he returns to Ermizahd and marries her, hoping the planet is at last at peace.

Phoenix in Obsidian (1970) 
100 years after the events of The Eternal Champion, Erekosë still lives peacefully with his wife Ermizahd and the rest of the Eldren people. After experiencing strange dreams again, he is pulled through time and space to a dark world covered in ice that orbits a dimming sun. Though he remembers and misses his life as Erekosë, he now has the form and mind of Urlik Skarsol, a warrior who lived on this world and died many years ago. Arriving at the city Rowenarc, he is disappointed to learn the human inhabitants are listless hedonists awaiting the end of the world. The planet also houses the Silver Warriors, who invaded from the Moon long ago.

Urlik later has a vision of the Lady of the Chalice, who demands that he wield the living blade known as the Black Sword. Sensing its dark power, Urlick refuses. After events lead to Urlick being marooned on a deserted island, he meets Jermays the Crooked. who claims they are friends even if Urlik doesn't remember. Jermays discusses the nature of Law and Chaos, the two forces that influence the multiverse, both of which must sometimes be forced into balance by the Eternal Champion. Jermays advises Urlik to take up the Black Sword, then leaves. In an obsidian cave, Urlick reflects that he is like a phoenix, immortal in a sense since he is reborn time and again, yet also trapped like a fly in amber by his role as the Eternal Champion.

Urlik is rescued by members of the human settlement of the Scarlet Fjord, led by Bladrak. He learns that they summoned him here to this world, on the advice of the Lady of the Chalice. They have with them the Cold Sword, a manifestation of the Black Sword, which Urlik instinctively fears. Later, Urlik learns that the human Belphig secretly commands the Silver Warriors because he holds their Silver Queen hostage. Urlik rescues the queen and realizes she is the Lady of the Chalice, an identity she assumed by broadcasting her voice and image in order to bring aid. With their queen free, the Silver Warriors turn against Belphig and defeat him. After the battle, the Lady of the Chalice tells Urlik a legend that holds the key to reigniting the sun. The Silver Queen summons the Screaming Chalice and Urlik kills with the Cold Sword. Her blood, collected in the mystical Chalice, is used to reignite the sun. The sword vanishes. In the Hawkmoon novel The Quest for Tanelorn, it is explained that the Black Sword could no longer physically manifest in that world when it had been used to bring new life to the sun, an act completely counter to its nature and vampiric desires.

As later revealed in the novel The Dragon in the Sword, Urlik lives to be an old man on this ice world. Though he makes friend, he misses Ermizhad. Attempting to send his mind through different dimensional planes to find her, he instead meets the mysterious Knight in Black and Yellow. The Knight calls him John Draker and tells him to board the Dark Ship, a vessel that travels through different dimensional planes and realities. The Knight tells him the ship can eventually take him to the city of Tanelorn and reunite him with Ermizhad. Urlik boards the ship many times, leading to his next several adventures and identities across time and space, though he does not always remember them clearly when he returns to the ship in-between each voyage.

The King of the Swords (1971) 
The King of the Swords is the third novel starring Corum, last of the Vadhagh race and another aspect of the Eternal Champion. In the book, Corum challenges the cosmic threat known as the King of Swords. To aid him in gaining vengeance and keeping reality in balance, Corum summons the aid of other Eternal Champion incarnations. He is joined by Elric of Melniboné and the warrior who calls himself Erekosë. Together, they fight as "the Three Who Are One".

The events of this team-up are retold and expanded on in Elric's novel The Sleeping Sorceress (later also published under the title The Vanishing Tower).

The Quest for Tanelorn (1975)/Sailors on the Seas of Fate (1976) 
This adventure is originally shared in the Hawkmoon novel The Quest for Tanelorn, then retold from a different perspective in the Elric book The Sailors on the Seas of Fate (1976).

When the sibling sorcerers Agak and Gagak threaten the entire multiverse, the Dark Ship recruits several warriors, including John Daker/Erekosë some time after his adventures as Urlik (the warrior explains he remembers having many names and simply prefers to be called Erekosë). Three other aspects of the Eternal Champion join: Elric, Corum, and Dorian Hawkmoon. As the "Four Who Are One", they band together in a unique way to save reality from the sorcerers. Corum remembers their previous team-up during The King of the Swords, but from the perspective of Elric and Erekosë that adventure hasn't happened yet.

The Swords of Heaven, the Flowers of Hell (graphic novel, 1978)
In the graphic novel plotted by Moorcock and written/illustrated by Howard Chaykin, Erekosë is pulled to another part of the multiverse again, now assuming the role of a noble named Clen of Clen-Gar (who resembles actor Burt Lancaster). Clen explores the "Dream Marches", part of a greater territory known as "Heaven". In his travels, Clen befriends a peaceful race known as "Angels", who take on different forms such as human-sized ant-like beings or flying manatees. By day, they gracefully float through Heaven, absorbing water vapor, and by night they release the stored water as acid rain upon a neighboring land called "Hell". The savage inhabitants of Hell live in a state of desperation and poverty compared to the luxury of Heaven and the Dream Marches.

Erekosë has a brief romantic affair with Lady Gradesmor (who resembles actor Sophia Loren), a noble woman whose husband was killed in one of the frequent battles between Heaven and Hell. The story ends with Erekosë going aboard the Dark Ship again.

In 2018, the graphic novel was reprinted in hardcover by Titan Comics as part of the Michael Moorcock Library series.

The Dragon in the Sword (1987)
John Daker/Erekosë recounts how repeated journeys aboard the Dark Ship, and the hope that it would take him to Ermizhad, led to his team-ups with other Eternal Champions as well as his adventures as Clen of Clen-Gar. After giving up hope the Dark Ship will take him to his lost love, he returns to his identity and life as Urlik, an old man on a frozen world. Time passes and Urlik nears death. After visitations by Jermays and the Knight in Black and Yellow urge, and being tormented by dreams and visions, Erekosë calls the Dark Ship and boards it again. He is taken to the Middle Marches, a place also known as Maaschanheem or the "Six Realms of the Wheel" because it joins six different planes of reality revolving around the same cosmic axis, allowing people from different times and places to intersect. The Dark Ship's captain explains the balance between Law and Chaos has been upset again and the Eternal Champion is needed. During all this, Jermays, the Knight, and the Captain all refer to the character as John Daker but he says he prefers the name of Erekosë.

Seeing his next body/identity, a man with several weapons dressed in dark leather and a cape, Daker/Erekosë leaves the ship and manifests his new identity. He is now Prince Flamadin, a man who died on his world some time ago when he was murdered by his corrupt twin sister Princess Sharadim, whom he planned to oppose. Even after Daker assumes the identity and form of Flamadin, Princess Sharadim keeps the original body of her dead twin preserved for the sake of secret rituals. She plans to summon Archduke Balarizaaf and his army of Chaos, which puts all reality in danger. To do this, she requires the Dragon Sword, another manifestation of the Black Sword.

Arriving in the Middle Marches, Daker/Flamadin immediately befriends Count Ulric von Bek, who recently escaped the Nazis in 1939 before finding himself in the Middle Marches. The two become allies and later meet Alisaard, one of the Eldren Ghost Woman (who resembles Ermizhad). They embark on a quest to free a cosmic dragon trapped in the Dragon Sword and stop Princess Sharadim's schemes. Together, Flamadin, von Bek, and Alisaard manage to reunite the Ursine Princes, find the Holy Grail, convince Adolf Hitler to lose World War II, and summon the Cosmic Balance army known as the "Warriors on the Edge of Time" before finally defeating the Archduke's army of Chaos. Flamadin is able to achieve victory partly by accepting that his life as John Daker also had meaning and value despite not involving great wars and battles. In the end, the Dragon Sword is split into two, freeing the cosmic dragon.

The dragon leads Alisaard and her people, the Eldren Ghost Women, to another dimensional plane where they are reunited with the rest of their race. Ulric, having fallen in love with Alisaard, joins her on this journey. Jermays the Crooked appears and implies the descendants of Ulric von Bek and Alisaard will become the people of Melniboné, the same society that later births Elric. What's more, the Dragon Sword's two halves will be reforged into Mournblade and its twin Stormbringer, latter being the same sword Elric will use as an Eternal Champion.

Becoming a passenger on the Dark Ship once again, Erekosë is brought back to his life as John Daker in 20th century London. With a new appreciation for this life, he is confident he will find another aspect of Ermizhad. While the first book in the series mentioned he had a wife and child, no mention of either is made in this book and it is implied that he lives alone and is unmarried. It is possible John Daker's life history was altered by his many adventures across space and time, or that his circumstances changed after his return and he didn't explain it in the narration. It could also simply be an error, as Michael Moorcock has said he does not re-read most of his older work, leading sometimes to inconsistencies in continuity and character histories.

In popular culture
Erekosë, along with various other aspects of the Champion, is mentioned briefly in the song "Damned for All Time" by German power metal band Blind Guardian on their Follow the Blind album. Italian metal band Domine have also recorded a song based on the Eternal Champion concept on their Champion Eternal album. No specific aspects of the Champion are named in this song, but the narrator is aware of what he is, a trait belonging only to Erekosë. This song is titled "The Eternal Champion".

References

External links
 Moorcock's Miscellany (formerly Tanelorn, Multiverse.org, and Moorcock's Weekly Miscellany)

Literary characters introduced in 1962
Book series introduced in 1970
Male characters in literature
Eternal Champion (character)
Michael Moorcock characters